Elizabeth Stanhope, Countess of Chesterfield (c. 1677–1708) was the wife of Philip Stanhope, 3rd Earl of Chesterfield, and the daughter of George Savile, 1st Marquess of Halifax. Her mother was probably the former Gertrude Pierrepont, Halifax's second wife.

It was to Elizabeth that her father addressed a work entitled The Lady’s New Year’s Gift: or Advice to a Daughter. She married Philip Stanhope in 1692. They had one son, Philip Dormer Stanhope, 4th Earl of Chesterfield.

External links

English countesses
1677 births
1708 deaths
Daughters of British marquesses
Elizabeth
Elizabeth